Saeb Muhammad Salih Erekat ( Ṣāʼib ʻUrayqāt; also ʻRēqāt, Erikat, Erakat, Arekat; 28 April 195510 November 2020) was a Palestinian politician and diplomat who was the secretary general of the executive committee of the PLO from 2015 until his death in 2020. He served as chief of the PLO Steering and Monitoring Committee until 12 February 2011. He participated in early negotiations with Israel  and remained chief negotiator from 1995 until May 2003, when he resigned in protest from the Palestinian government. He reconciled with the party and was reappointed to the post in September 2003.

Personal life and education
Erekat was born in Abu Dis. He was a member of the Palestinian branch of the Erekat family, itself a branch of the Howeitat tribal confederation. Erekat was one of seven children, with his brothers and sisters living outside of Israel or the Palestinian territories. He was 12 years old when the Israelis occupied the West Bank, and was detained by them a year later for writing anti-occupation graffiti, posting fliers and throwing stones.

In 1972, Erekat moved to San Francisco, California, to attend college. He spent two years at City College of San Francisco, a two-year community college. He then transferred to San Francisco State University. There, Erekat received a BA in international relations (in 1977) and an MA in political science (in 1979). He completed his PhD in peace and conflict studies at the University of Bradford in England (in 1983).

Erekat was married to Neameh, and was the father of twin daughters Dalal and Salam; and two sons, Ali and Muhammad.

Career
After gaining his doctorate in England, Erekat moved to the West Bank town of Nablus to lecture in political science at An-Najah National University and also served for 12 years on the editorial board of the locally widely circulated Palestinian newspaper, Al-Quds.

Politics
In 1991, Erekat was deputy head of the Palestinian delegation to the Madrid Conference and the subsequent follow-up talks in Washington D.C. between 1992 and 1993. In 1994, he was appointed the Minister for Local Government for the Palestinian National Authority and also the Chairman of the Palestinian negotiation delegation. In 1995, Erekat served as Chief Negotiator for the Palestinians during the Oslo period. He was then elected to the Palestinian Legislative Council in 1996, representing Jericho. As a politician, Erekat was considered to be a Yasser Arafat loyalist, including the Camp David meetings in 2000 and the negotiations at Taba in 2001. Erekat was also, along with Arafat and Faisal Husseini, one of the three high-ranking Palestinians who asked Ariel Sharon not to visit the Al-Aqsa Mosque in September 2000, an event which was followed by the Second Intifada. He also acted as Arafat's English interpreter. When Mahmoud Abbas was nominated to serve as Prime Minister of the Palestinian Legislative Council in early 2003, Erekat was slated to be Minister of Negotiations in the new cabinet, but he soon resigned after he was excluded from a delegation to meet Israeli Prime Minister Ariel Sharon. This was interpreted as part of an internal Palestinian power struggle between Abbas and Arafat. Erekat was later reappointed to his post and participated in the 2007 Annapolis Conference, where he took over from Ahmed Qurei during an impasse and helped hammer out a joint declaration.

He resigned from his post as chief negotiator on 12 February 2011 citing the release of the Palestine Papers. In July 2013, however, he was still holding the function. In 2015, he became the secretary-general of the Executive Committee of the Palestine Liberation Organization. He later promoted a plan for the basis for new talks with international diplomats including Jared Kushner, President Donald Trump's son-in-law and special adviser.

Legacy
Erekat was one of the more prominent Palestinian spokespeople in the Western media. He wrote extensively in the media about Palestinian statehood, and was a vocal critic of the Trump administration's peace plan.

During the Second Intifada, he loudly criticized Israeli actions and characterized the IDF's 2002 assault in the Palestinian town of Jenin as a "massacre" and a "war crime", alleging that Israel has killed more than 500 Palestinians in the Jenin refugee camp. After the incident was over, however, and the Palestinian death toll was actually recorded at between 53 and 56, mostly combatants, Erekat faced strong criticism in the United States.

Erekat at one time maintained good relations with his counterpart negotiators, in which Israeli justice minister Tsipi Livni mentioned that her talks with Erekat were always honest, and there was mutual respect despite frequent disagreements. In addition, Erekat  took his American counterpart, Martin Indyk, on a tour of Hisham's Palace near Jericho.

Health issues and death
On 8 May 2012, Erekat was hospitalized in Ramallah after suffering a heart attack.
	
On 12 October 2017, he had a lung transplant at Inova Fairfax Hospital in northern Virginia, United States.
	
Erekat, who was suffering from pulmonary fibrosis, tested positive for COVID-19 on 9 October 2020. On 18 October, he was sent to the Israeli Hadassah Ein Karem hospital in Jerusalem in critical condition. On 21 October, his daughter said on Twitter that he underwent a bronchoscopy to examine the condition of his respiratory system. Erekat died of complications from COVID-19 on 10 November 2020, at the age of 65. He was interred in the cemetery in Jericho.

Works

 Imam Ali Bin Abi Taleb and Negotiations (2015)

See also
Arab–Israeli conflict
Israeli–Palestinian conflict
Foreign relations of Israel

References

External links

 Saeb Erekat debates Dan Meridor at the International Peace Institute, June 25, 2010 (video)
 San Francisco State University magazine interview with Saeb Erekat

1955 births
2020 deaths
People from Abu Dis
Fatah members
Palestinian diplomats
Members of the 2006 Palestinian Legislative Council
Members of the 1996 Palestinian Legislative Council
Academic staff of An-Najah National University
City College of San Francisco alumni
State ministers of Palestine
Government ministers of the Palestinian National Authority
People from Jericho
San Francisco State University alumni
Alumni of the University of Bradford
Palestinian people imprisoned by Israel
Lung transplant recipients
Deaths from the COVID-19 pandemic in Israel
Deaths from the COVID-19 pandemic in the State of Palestine
Members of the Executive Committee of the Palestine Liberation Organization
Central Committee of Fatah members
Erekat family
21st-century Palestinian diplomats
20th-century Palestinian diplomats
21st-century Palestinian politicians
20th-century Palestinian politicians